Methionine (symbol Met or M) is an essential amino acid in humans. As the precursor of other amino acids such as cysteine and taurine, versatile compounds such as SAM-e, and the important antioxidant glutathione, methionine plays a critical role in the metabolism and health of many species, including humans. It is encoded by the codon AUG.

Methionine is also an important part of angiogenesis, the growth of new blood vessels. Supplementation may benefit those suffering from copper poisoning. Overconsumption of methionine, the methyl group donor in DNA methylation, is related to cancer growth in a number of studies. Methionine was first isolated in 1921 by John Howard Mueller.

Biochemical details
Methionine (abbreviated as Met or M; encoded by the codon AUG) is an α-amino acid that is used in the biosynthesis of proteins. It contains a carboxyl group (which is in the deprotonated −COO− form under biological pH conditions), an amino group (which is in the protonated  form under biological pH conditions) located in α-position with respect to the carboxyl group, and an S-methyl thioether side chain, classifying it as a nonpolar, aliphatic amino acid.

In nuclear genes of eukaryotes and in Archaea, methionine is coded for by the start codon, meaning it indicates the start of the coding region and is the first amino acid produced in a nascent polypeptide during mRNA translation.

A proteinogenic amino acid
Together with cysteine, methionine is one of two sulfur-containing proteinogenic amino acids. Excluding the few exceptions where methionine may act as a redox sensor (e.g.,), methionine residues do not have a catalytic role. This is in contrast to cysteine residues, where the thiol group has a catalytic role in many proteins. The thioether does however have a minor structural role due to the stability effect of S/π interactions between the side chain sulfur atom and aromatic amino acids in one-third of all known protein structures. This lack of a strong role is reflected in experiments where little effect is seen in proteins where methionine is replaced by norleucine, a straight hydrocarbon sidechain amino acid which lacks the thioether.
It has been conjectured that norleucine was present in early versions of the genetic code, but methionine intruded into the final version of the genetic code due to the fact it is used in the cofactor S-adenosylmethionine (SAM-e). This situation is not unique and may have occurred with ornithine and arginine.

Encoding
Methionine is one of only two amino acids encoded by a single codon (AUG) in the standard genetic code (tryptophan, encoded by UGG, is the other). In reflection to the evolutionary origin of its codon, the other AUN codons encode isoleucine, which is also a hydrophobic amino acid. In the mitochondrial genome of several organisms, including metazoa and yeast, the codon AUA also encodes for methionine. In the standard genetic code AUA codes for isoleucine and the respective tRNA (ileX in Escherichia coli) uses the unusual base lysidine (bacteria) or agmatidine (archaea) to discriminate against AUG.

The methionine codon AUG is also the most common start codon. A "Start" codon is message for a ribosome that signals the initiation of protein translation from mRNA when the AUG codon is in a Kozak consensus sequence. As a consequence, methionine is often incorporated into the N-terminal position of proteins in eukaryotes and archaea during translation, although it can be removed by post-translational modification. In bacteria, the derivative N-formylmethionine is used as the initial amino acid.

Derivatives

S-Adenosylmethionine

The methionine-derivative S-adenosylmethionine (SAM-e) is a cofactor that serves mainly as a methyl donor. SAM-e is composed of an adenosyl molecule (via 5′ carbon) attached to the sulfur of methionine, therefore making it a sulfonium cation (i.e., three substituents and positive charge). The sulfur acts as a soft Lewis acid (i.e., donor/electrophile) which allows the S-methyl group to be transferred to an oxygen, nitrogen, or aromatic system, often with the aid of other cofactors such as cobalamin (vitamin B12 in humans). Some enzymes use SAM-e to initiate a radical reaction; these are called radical SAM-e enzymes.
As a result of the transfer of the methyl group, S-adenosylhomocysteine is obtained. In bacteria, this is either regenerated by methylation or is salvaged by removing the adenine and the homocysteine, leaving the compound dihydroxypentandione to spontaneously convert into autoinducer-2, which is excreted as a waste product or quorum signal.

Biosynthesis 

As an essential amino acid, methionine is not synthesized de novo in humans and other animals, which must ingest methionine or methionine-containing proteins.  In plants and microorganisms, methionine biosynthesis belongs to the aspartate family, along with threonine and lysine (via diaminopimelate, but not via α-aminoadipate). The main backbone is derived from aspartic acid, while the sulfur may come from cysteine, methanethiol, or hydrogen sulfide.
 First, aspartic acid is converted via β-aspartyl semialdehyde into homoserine by two reduction steps of the terminal carboxyl group (homoserine has therefore a γ-hydroxyl, hence the homo- series). The intermediate aspartate semialdehyde is the branching point with the lysine biosynthetic pathway, where it is instead condensed with pyruvate. Homoserine is the branching point with the threonine pathway, where instead it is isomerised after activating the terminal hydroxyl with phosphate (also used for methionine biosynthesis in plants).
 Homoserine is then activated with a phosphate, succinyl or an acetyl group on the hydroxyl.
 In plants and possibly in some bacteria, phosphate is used. This step is shared with threonine biosynthesis.
 In most organisms, an acetyl group is used to activate the homoserine. This can be catalysed in bacteria by an enzyme encoded by metX or metA (not homologues). 
 In enterobacteria and a limited number of other organisms, succinate is used. The enzyme that catalyses the reaction is MetA and the specificity for acetyl-CoA and succinyl-CoA is dictated by a single residue. The physiological basis for the preference of acetyl-CoA or succinyl-CoA is unknown, but such alternative routes are present in some other pathways (e.g. lysine biosynthesis and arginine biosynthesis).
 The hydroxyl activating group is then replaced with cysteine, methanethiol, or hydrogen sulfide. A replacement reaction is technically a γ-elimination followed by a variant of a Michael addition. All the enzymes involved are homologues and members of the Cys/Met metabolism PLP-dependent enzyme family, which is a subset of the PLP-dependent fold type I clade. They utilise the cofactor PLP (pyridoxal phosphate), which functions by stabilising carbanion intermediates. 
 If it reacts with cysteine, it produces cystathionine, which is cleaved to yield homocysteine. The enzymes involved are cystathionine-γ-synthase (encoded by metB in bacteria) and cystathionine-β-lyase (metC). Cystathionine is bound differently in the two enzymes allowing β or γ reactions to occur. 
 If it reacts with free hydrogen sulfide, it produces homocysteine. This is catalysed by O-acetylhomoserine aminocarboxypropyltransferase (formerly known as O-acetylhomoserine (thiol)-lyase. It is encoded by either metY or metZ in bacteria. 
 If it reacts with  methanethiol, it produces methionine directly. Methanethiol is a byproduct of catabolic pathway of certain compounds, therefore this route is more uncommon. 
 If homocysteine is produced, the thiol group is methylated, yielding methionine. Two methionine synthases are known; one is cobalamin (vitamin B12) dependent and one is independent.

The pathway using cysteine is called the "transsulfuration pathway", while the pathway using hydrogen sulfide (or methanethiol) is called "direct-sulfurylation pathway".

Cysteine is similarly produced, namely it can be made from an activated serine and either from homocysteine ("reverse transsulfurylation route") or from hydrogen sulfide ("direct sulfurylation route"); the activated serine is generally O-acetylserine (via CysK or CysM in E. coli), but in Aeropyrum pernix and some other archaea O-phosphoserine is used. CysK and CysM are homologues, but belong to the PLP fold type III clade.

Transsulfurylation pathway

Enzymes involved in the E. coli transsulfurylation route of methionine biosynthesis:
 Aspartokinase
 Aspartate-semialdehyde dehydrogenase
 Homoserine dehydrogenase
 Homoserine O-transsuccinylase
 Cystathionine-γ-synthase
 Cystathionine-β-lyase
 Methionine synthase (in mammals, this step is performed by homocysteine methyltransferase or betaine—homocysteine S-methyltransferase.)

Other biochemical pathways 

Although mammals cannot synthesize methionine, they can still use it in a variety of biochemical pathways:

Catabolism
Methionine is converted to S-adenosylmethionine (SAM-e) by (1) methionine adenosyltransferase.

SAM-e serves as a methyl donor in many (2) methyltransferase reactions, and is converted to S-adenosylhomocysteine (SAH).

(3) Adenosylhomocysteinase
cysteine.

Regeneration
Methionine can be regenerated from homocysteine via (4) methionine synthase in a reaction that requires vitamin B12 as a cofactor.

Homocysteine can also be remethylated using glycine betaine (N,N,N-trimethylglycine, TMG) to methionine via the enzyme betaine-homocysteine methyltransferase (E.C.2.1.1.5, BHMT).  BHMT makes up to 1.5% of all the soluble protein of the liver, and recent evidence suggests that it may have a greater influence on methionine and homocysteine homeostasis than methionine synthase.

Reverse-transulfurylation pathway: conversion to cysteine
Homocysteine can be converted to cysteine.

 (5) Cystathionine-β-synthase (an enzyme which requires the active form of vitamin B6, pyridoxal phosphate) combines homocysteine and serine to produce cystathionine.  Instead of degrading cystathionine via cystathionine-β-lyase, as in the biosynthetic pathway, cystathionine is broken down to cysteine and α-ketobutyrate via (6) cystathionine-γ-lyase.
 (7) The enzyme α-ketoacid dehydrogenase converts α-ketobutyrate to propionyl-CoA, which is metabolized to succinyl-CoA in a three-step process (see propionyl-CoA for pathway).

Ethylene synthesis
This amino acid is also used by plants for synthesis of ethylene. The process is known as the Yang cycle or the methionine cycle.

Chemical synthesis
The industrial synthesis combines acrolein, methanethiol, and cyanide, which affords the hydantoin. Racemic methionine can also be synthesized from diethyl sodium phthalimidomalonate by alkylation with chloroethylmethylsulfide (ClCH2CH2SCH3) followed by hydrolysis and decarboxylation.

Human nutrition

Requirements
The Food and Nutrition Board  of the U.S. Institute of Medicine set Recommended Dietary Allowances (RDAs) for essential amino acids in 2002. For methionine combined with cysteine, for adults 19 years and older, 19 mg/kg body weight/day.

This translates to about 1.33 grams per day for a 70 kilogram individual.

Dietary sources

High levels of methionine can be found in eggs, meat, and fish; sesame seeds, Brazil nuts, and some other plant seeds; and cereal grains. Most fruits and vegetables contain very little. Most legumes, though protein dense, are low in methionine. Proteins without adequate methionine are not considered to be complete proteins. For that reason, racemic methionine is sometimes added as an ingredient to pet foods.

Restriction
Some scientific evidence indicates restricting methionine consumption can increase lifespans in fruit flies.

A 2005 study showed methionine restriction without energy restriction extends mouse lifespans. This extension requires intact growth hormone signaling, as animals without intact growth-hormone signaling do not have a further increase in lifespan when methionine restricted. The metabolic response to methionine restriction is also altered in mouse growth hormone signaling mutants.

A study published in Nature showed adding just the essential amino acid methionine to the diet of fruit flies under dietary restriction, including restriction of essential amino acids (EAAs), restored fertility without reducing the longer lifespans that are typical of dietary restriction, leading the researchers to determine that methionine "acts in combination with one or more other EAAs to shorten lifespan." Restoring methionine to the diet of mice on a dietary restriction regimen blocks many acute benefits of dietary restriction, a process that may be mediated by increased production of hydrogen sulfide.

Methionine restriction can increase circulating liver hormone FGF21 between 5-fold and 10-fold in mice.  Several studies showed that methionine restriction also inhibits aging-related disease processes in mice and inhibits colon carcinogenesis in rats. In humans, methionine restriction through dietary modification could be achieved through a plant-based diet.

Restriction of dietary methionine reduces levels of its catabolite S-adenosylmethionine (SAM-e), resulting is a subsequent loss of histone methylation. An active process mediated by a specific, preserved methylation of H3K9 preserves the memory of the original methylation profile, allowing the epigenome to be restored when dietary methionine levels return.

A 2009 study on rats showed "methionine supplementation in the diet specifically increases mitochondrial ROS production and mitochondrial DNA oxidative damage in rat liver mitochondria offering a plausible mechanism for its hepatotoxicity".

However, since methionine is an essential amino acid, it cannot be entirely removed from animals' diets without disease or death occurring over time. For example, rats fed a diet without methionine and choline developed steatohepatitis (fatty liver) and anemia, and lost two-thirds of their body weight over 5 weeks. Administration of methionine ameliorated the pathological consequences of methionine deprivation. Short-term removal of only methionine from the diet can reverse diet-induced obesity and promotes insulin sensitivity in mice, and methionine restriction also protects a mouse model of spontaneous, polygenic obesity and diabetes.

Health
Loss of methionine has been linked to senile greying of hair. Its lack leads to a buildup of hydrogen peroxide in hair follicles, a reduction in tyrosinase effectiveness, and a gradual loss of hair color. Methionine raises the intracellular concentration of glutathione, thereby promoting antioxidant mediated cell defense and redox regulation. It also protects cells against dopamine induced nigral cell loss by binding oxidative metabolites.

Methionine is an intermediate in the biosynthesis of cysteine, carnitine, taurine, lecithin, phosphatidylcholine, and other phospholipids. Improper conversion of methionine can lead to atherosclerosis due to accumulation of homocysteine.

Other uses
DL-Methionine is sometimes given as a supplement to dogs; It helps reduce the chances of kidney stones in dogs. Methionine is also known to increase the urinary excretion of quinidine by acidifying the urine. Aminoglycoside antibiotics used to treat urinary tract infections work best in alkaline conditions, and urinary acidification from using methionine can reduce its effectiveness. If a dog is on a diet that acidifies the urine, methionine should not be used.

Methionine is allowed as a supplement to organic poultry feed under the US certified organic program.

Methionine can be used as a nontoxic pesticide option against giant swallowtail caterpillars, which are a serious pest to orange crops.

See also 
 Allantoin
 Formylmethionine
 Methionine oxidation
 Paracetamol poisoning 
 Photoreactive methionine
 S-Methylcysteine

References

External links 
 

Proteinogenic amino acids
Glucogenic amino acids
Sulfur amino acids
Thioethers
Essential amino acids